The 1989 Santa Clara Broncos football team represented Santa Clara University as a member of the Western Football Conference (WFC) during the 1989 NCAA Division II football season.   The Broncos were led by fifth-year head coach Terry Malley. They played home games at Buck Shaw Stadium in Santa Clara, California. Santa Clara finished the season with a record of seven wins and four losses (7–4, 3–3 WFC). The Broncos outscored their opponents 250–211 for the season.

Schedule

Team players in the NFL
No Santa Clara Broncos players were selected in the 1990 NFL Draft.

The following finished their college career in 1989, were not drafted, but played in the NFL.

References

Santa Clara
Santa Clara Broncos football seasons
Santa Clara Broncos football